Franciszek Misztal (15 March 1901, in a village Lisie Jamy near Lubaczów – 9 June 1981, in Warsaw) - Polish aircraft designer.

He studied at Lviv Polytechnic and received his doctorate in 1929 at the Technical University in Aachen. From 1928 he worked in the PZL in Warsaw as a constructor. Contributor to the design of aircraft PZL.23 Karaś (caisson wings), PZL.19, PZL.26  and the chief designer (and author of the concept) of PZL.38 Wilk. Inventor of the caisson structure with corrugated wings.

During World War II he was teaching mechanics in Warsaw. After the war, the founder of CSS construction bureau, then professor at the Warsaw University of Technology and the Institute of Aviation, where together with Leszek Dulęba constructed the prototype 4-engine passenger aircraft PZL MD-12, and the secretary of Division IV of the Polish Academy of Sciences.

References
 Jerzy Ryszard Konieczny, Tadeusz Malinowski, Mała encyklopedia lotników polskich, tomik II, series Biblioteczka Skrzydlatej Polski, Wydawnictwa Komunikacji i Łączności, Warszawa 1988, p. 75

1901 births
1981 deaths
Polish designers
Academic staff of the Wrocław University of Science and Technology
Aircraft designers
RWTH Aachen University alumni